Angaston  is a town on the eastern side of the Barossa Valley in South Australia, 77 km northeast of Adelaide. Its elevation is 347 m, one of the highest points in the valley, and has an average rainfall of 561
 mm. Angaston was originally known as German Pass, but was later renamed after the politician, banker and pastoralist George Fife Angas, who settled in the area in the 1850s. Angaston is in the Barossa Council local government area, the state electoral district of Schubert and the federal Division of Barker.

Railway 

Angaston was the terminus of the Barossa Valley railway line which was built in 1911. The railway has now closed and been replaced by part of the Barossa Trail walking and cycling path from Nuriootpa.

Notable former residents
 George Fife Angas (1789–1879) politician, banker and possible former slaveholder or slavery emancipist.
 Sir John Keith Angas (1900–1977) pastoralist 
 Hugh Thomas Moffitt Angwin (1888–1949) engineer and public servant
 William Hague (1864–1924) storekeeper and politician
 Brian Hurn (1939–2015), cricketer.
 O. P. Heggie (1877–1936) Actor. Played the Hermit who befriends the Monster in Bride of Frankenstein (1935)

Wineries
 Yalumba
 Saltram Winery
 Lambert Estate

Other places 
 The Old Union Chapel
 Collingrove Homestead
 Pioneer Park in Murray Street
 Memorial Reserve

Tour Down Under

2014
The finish of the  first stage of the 2014 Tour Down Under occurred on 21 January 2014 within the town. The race started in Nuriootpa and was won by Simon Gerrans of Orica–GreenEDGE.

References

External links

 The history of Angaston

Towns in South Australia
Barossa Valley
Populated places established in 1842